Sky Replay is a British pay television channel operated by Sky as a sister channel to Sky Max and Sky Witness. The current channel began broadcasting (as Sky One Mix) in December 2002. The 'Sky 2' name and format had earlier been used for a similar service which broadcast on analogue platforms for a year from 1996. On 27 August 2020, the service rebranded as Sky Replay. The channel broadcasts repeats of programmes from Sky Max (formerly Sky One) and Sky Witness.

Branding and presentation 

Sky One Mix launched on 9 December 2002 as a Sky One sister channel. The channel used a logo and presentation design similar to that used by Sky One at the time, but with a yellow and black theme as opposed to the orange and white used by Sky One at the time.

Sky One Mix  was rebranded Sky Mix in 2004, at the same time as Sky One moved away from the orange logo (Sky Mix retained the yellow theme carried over from its previous identity, but stripped of any reference to 'Sky One'.) Instead of using a yellow logo, it used a dark green logo.

In November 2005, in tandem with the launch of  Sky Three (now Pick), Sky Mix was relaunched as Sky Two and began using Kaktus Films' animated idents in line with those introduced on Sky One the prior year.

On 31 August 2008, the channel adopted a revised branding of Sky 2, when Sky's entertainment channels relaunched with numeric names and shared branding elements, utilising blue solids (Sky 1), green liquids (Sky 2) and pink particles (Sky 3).

On 1 February 2011, Sky refreshed the presentation on many of its channels. Sky Two's new idents would follow along the same themes as Sky One's, but the action is in close-up, featuring a small metal '2' icon (in contrast to Sky One's giant '1' symbol). Sky One would later switch to programme-themed idents, whilst Sky Two largely continued to use the 2011 sequences; in April 2016, when Sky One got new animated identity sequences, Sky Two received a revised version of its 2011 films, with a larger Sky Two logo caption appearing at the end of the sequence, and the backing music changed to that previously used by the Sky One versions of the films.

Whilst it initially enjoyed a prominent position on the Sky guide close to Sky One, Sky Two had since 2011 progressively been moved down the programme guide on the Sky satellite platform to make room for other services. In February 2011, to make way for the relaunched Sky Living, Sky Two moved to channel 129, previously home to Syfy. On 21 February 2012, it moved up to 121, previously owned by Sky Living +1. In 2015, with the re-combination of Sky Arts into a single channel and its move up the grid, Sky Two moved back to 129. And in summer 2017, the relaunch of Sky Sports into genre-based channels saw the move of Sky Sports Mix into the entertainment guide, resulting in the relocation of other services including Sky Two. On 1 May 2018, Sky Two moved up to channel 123 as part of another reshuffling by Sky. It replaced ITV Encore, which closed on the same day. On 22 October 2018, the channel moved down to 151, swapping places with E!. On 1 October 2019, the channel moved down to 170 following the closure of Real Lives and launch of Sky Crime, and moved again to 168 on 19 November 2019 following the closure of YourTV.

On 9 October 2017, the branding and presentation on Sky's entertainment channels was revised again; as part of this the names Sky One and Sky Two were reintroduced nine years after the switch to numerals. Sky Two dropped its previous filmed idents in favour of using an animated sting featuring the new channel logo.

Whereas Sky One had been available in HD since the launch of Sky HD in 2006, both Sky Two and Sky Three were available in standard-definition only.

On 27 August 2020, Sky Two was rebranded as Sky Replay and moved to Sky channel 145 as a result, while its previous owner, Sky Sports Mix, moved to channel 416.

On 8 November 2022, Sky Replay swapped channel numbers with Challenge.

Programming

Sky Replay is in many ways a catch-up service for Sky's main entertainment channels, Sky Witness and Sky Max (formerly the now defunct Sky One) broadcasting their popular shows. Doing so, Sky Two is described as a time shuffle channel, so called to distinguish it from timeshift channels, which rebroadcast their principal channel, delayed by one hour.

Following the closure of the original Sky Real Lives in 2010, some of its factual and reality programming was relocated to Sky Two. Following the closure of Bravo in 2011, Sky Two adopted some of its programming, particularly in the science-fiction, drama and documentary fields.

With the retooling of Sky Living into the crime-focused Sky Witness, some former Sky Living programming (such as Four Weddings, My Kitchen Rules and Most Haunted) has transferred into the Sky Replay daytime schedule.

Sky One timeshift experiment

From 10 May to 9 August 2010, Sky conducted an experimental revision of service, under which Sky Two ceased to run its own full-time programme schedule, and instead predominantly operated a one-hour timeshift of programming on Sky One. Sky Two would, however, retain standalone branding. A Sky spokesperson said: "We are experimenting with different channel schedules to bring maximum value to our customers."

Some programmes were excluded from the timeshift device and replaced by alternate content on Sky Two during this period; shows which weren't shown on the time-delay included the premiere of Sky One's Terry Pratchett's Going Postal, the station's adaptation of the author's Discworld novel. Also not seen on a timeshift basis was the final ever episode of Lost, which was aired at 5am, as a simultaneous being broadcast with the US transmission. The last episodes of 24 (which Sky showed as a two-part finale) also weren't shown an hour later on Sky Two. The non-timeshifted programming would often be found an alternative slot on Sky Two (Terry Pratchett's Going Postal would be shown later in the week), essentially making Sky Two a 4seven-style 'time shuffle' channel during these periods.

The timeshift trial concluded on 9 August 2010, with Sky Two reverting to its previous scheduling pattern. A full one-hour timeshift of Sky One, as Sky One +1, was introduced on 12 November 2012. However, Sky do not currently offer a timeshifted version of Sky Two, or Sky Replay.

Virgin Media UK dispute
On Thursday 1 March 2007, Virgin Media blacked out Sky's basic channels, including Sky One, Sky Two, Sky News, Sky Sports News, Sky Travel and Sky Travel Extra, from their cable television services after a dispute between Virgin Media and BSkyB caused by the expiry of their carriage agreement and their inability to reach a new deal. At midnight, Sky Two was removed, and the name of the station in the Virgin EPG was changed to read "Old Sky Two Try Living". 
On 13 November 2008, following the agreement of a new deal Sky Two along with Sky One, Sky News and Sky Sports News were returned to Virgin Media's television service along with four more Sky channels: Sky Real Lives and Sky Real Lives 2 (which had replaced the Sky Travel channels on satellite since the dispute began) and Sky Arts 1 and Sky Arts 2, which had not previously been offered to cable viewers.

International
A version of Sky Replay for Germany launched on Sky Deutschland and Sky Ticket on 4 October 2021, replacing the previous local box-set channel Sky Serien & Shows.

References

External links
TV Listings at sky.com

Sky television channels
Television channels and stations established in 2002
English-language television stations in the United Kingdom
Television channels in the United Kingdom
2002 establishments in the United Kingdom